Chin State is a state in western Myanmar. The  Chin State is bordered by Sagaing Division and Magway Division to the east, Rakhine State to the south, the Chittagong Division of Bangladesh to the west, and the Indian states of Mizoram to the west and Manipur to the north. The population of Chin state is about 478,801 according to the 2014 census. The capital of the state is Hakha. The state is a mountainous region with few transportation links. Chin State is sparsely populated and remains one of the least developed areas of the country. Chin State has the highest poverty rate of 73% as per the released figures from the first official survey. The official radio broadcasting dialect of Chin is Falam. There are 53 different subtribes and languages in Chin State. There are nine townships in Chin State: Hakha, Thantlang, Falam, Tedim, Tonzang, Matupi, Mindat, Kanpetlet and Paletwa townships. In 1896, Mindat and Kanpetlet were placed under Pakokku Hill Tracts District of British Burma later emerged into Chin hills. Only Paletwa Township became a part of Arakan Hill Tracts of British Burma.

History

Early history
The Chin people entered the Chin Hills in the first millennium 1200 AD as part of the wider migration of Chin peoples into the area. For much of history, the sparsely populated Chin Hills were ruled by local chiefs. 

Some historians (Arthur Phayre, Tun Nyein) put Pateikkaya in eastern Bengal, thus wrongly placing the entire Chin Hills under Pagan suzerainty but others, like Harvey, citing stone inscriptions, properly put it near the eastern Chin Hills. (Burmese Chronicles report the kings of Pateikkaya as Indian though the ethnicity of the subjects is not explicitly cited.) Accordingly, since the first human settlement in the region later called Chin Hills as early as 10 century CE, no other external military conquest nor tributary influence was noticed either in oral traditions or other historical inscriptions but the rule and leadership of local native chiefs as listed above until the British advancement in the late 19th century.

Feudal era

The first confirmed political entity in the region was the Shan State of Kale (Kalay), founded by the Shan people who came to dominate Kale-Kabaw valley of the northwestern-to-eastern arc of Burma after the fall of the Pagan Kingdom in 1287. Kale was a minor Shan state. The minor state occasionally paid tribute to the larger Shan States of Mohnyin and Mogaung and ultimately became a vassal state of the Burmese Ava Kingdom in the 1370s. Starting in the 1480s, Ava began to disintegrate and Kale was swallowed up by the Shan State of Mohnyin by the 1520s. Three of the Saopha sons (Thein Kheing/Thuan Khai(Ancestor of Hlythi/Hlawncheu, Hauhulh and Zahao/Zahau), Phra Lung/Phurh hlum (Ancestor of Zanniat/Nuhma/Nohro(Sumthang,Syuhlo,Hlosa/Hluansang{Chozah/Cheizah/Chinzah, Zawtha/Zawthang/Zathang, Hlychho/Hlawnchhing, Khule/Khuhhly/Khenglawt, Hluansang, Hlikhai} and Notlia/Nuhnu/Nutlai), and Ral Thang{Mi-E, Thawr, Lente, Bawithang, Sailung}) fled to the Chin hills around 1400 where their descendants ruled the petty chiefdoms all over Falam, Hakha, and parts of Paletwa and Mindat district along with various villages in the hill range of Bangladesh (Chittagong Hill Tracts and India(Mizoram) as well some villages in Rakhaing State.

The Burmese kingdoms between 1555 and 1559 when King Bayinnaung of the Toungoo Dynasty conquered part of Upper Burma and its surrounding regions, stretching from the eastern and northern Shan states to the western Magway Division and plain region in Manipur. Toungoo began to weaken in the late 17th century. By the 1730s, a resurgent Manipuri Kingdom had conquered the Kabaw Valley, which is at the eastern front of Chin Hills, from the Burmese. Situated in a far west hilly region, however, Chin Hills was traditionally autonomous and far for successional Burman kingdoms to reach. Until British colonial rule, independent city-states such as Ciimnuai (Chinwe/Chin Nwe) later shifted to Tedim and Vangteh in the north, Tlaisun and Rallang in the mid-land, and Hakha, Thantlang and Zokhua in the south played important political role in securing peace of the region, and each city-state practised its own independent sovereignty in their own rights.

Colonial era
The British acquired the Chin Hills a decade after the Third Anglo-Burmese War of 1885. American missionaries began arriving in the 1890s and, by the middle of the 20th century, most of the Chin people had converted to Christianity. The ensuing Chin resistance to the British was suppressed only by 1896 with the arrest of Khai Kam Thuantak of Siyin area.In 1896,it became a part of Pakokku Hill Tracts Districts of British Burma until 1948,January 4. The administered the Chin Hills as part of Pakokku District.
The region was the westernmost advance of the Imperial Japanese Army, which occupied the region in November 1943, in World War II. After the war, Chin state leaders headed by Vawmthu Moung, with Burman, Shan and Kachin leaders, participated in the Panglong Conference which discussed the future of an independent Union of Burma. Because of the region's heavy economic dependence on Burma, Chin leaders, unlike Shan and Kachin leaders, asked only for a "special administrative division", not a full-fledged state. As a result, when the 1947 Constitution of Burma granted the right of secession to states after 10 years after the independence, the Chin people did not get a state (no right to secede). (The Karen, who did not participate in the conference, received a state, with the right to secede). Until 1974, three townships of today Chin State (Mindat,Kanpetlet and Matupi townships) were part of Pakokku Hill Tracts of Pakokku District and then, it became a part of Chin State Until now.

Post-Burmese independence
Upon Burma's independence from the United Kingdom in 1948, Chin Hills Special Division was created out of the Chin Hills, with its capital at Falam. However, three townships of modern Chin State (Mindat, Kanpetlet and Matupi) were part of the Pakokku Hill Tracts of Pakokku District and Paletwa Township of the Arakan Hill Tracts, until 4 January 1974. On 4 January 1974, the Chin Hills Special Division was granted state status and became Chin State. Today, Chin State has little infrastructure and remains extremely poor and undeveloped.

"Chin National Day" is designated on 20 February to commemorate the "General Assembly of Chinland" held in 1948. The first celebration of Chin National Day was held in 1951, but it was not well recognized by Myanmar governments until the 2010s.

Chin National Front proposed to designate 3 January as "Chin State Day".

Administrative divisions

To more easily convince the Chin people within the declaration of emergency rule by the Burma government, Chin State divided to two districts in the north (Hakha District and Falam District) and two in the south (Mindat and Matupi District) and was further subdivided into nine townships and three subtownships. Falam had been the district capital since the British colonization. After the military coup in 1962, the junta in the 1974 reorganization shifted the state capital to Hakha.

The township borders have been adjusted, most recently in a reorganization of Falam District in 2008. Falam Township lost area in its northeast to Tedim Township but gained territory from Tedim in the northwest, extending northward as far as the developing town of Rihkhawdar on the Indian border. In the reorganization, Falam lost a small area in its southwest back to Thantlang Township from which it had recently been shifted.

Districts and Townships
 Tedim District of Northern Chin State
 Tedim Township 
 Tonzang Township
 Cikha Subttownship
 Khaikam Town
 Falam District Central Chin State
 Falam Township
 Rihkhawdar Town
 Webula Town
 Hakha District of Central Chin State
 Hakha Township
 Surkhua Town
 Thantlang Township
 Hnaring Town
 Matupi District of Central and Southwestern Chin State
 Matupi Township
 Rezua Subtownship
 Lailenpi Town
 Paletwa Township
 Samee Subtownship
  Mindat District of Southeastern Chin State
 Mindat Township
 Makui Innu Town
 Kanpetlet Township

Hakha District was formed by the first Chin State Hluttaw emergency meeting No. 2/2012 on 1 June. Matupi District was formed by the second Pyidaungsu Hluttaw regular meeting on 28 June 2017.

Cities and towns
 Cikha, subtownship in the north
 Falam, northern Chin State (Falam District)
 Hakha, capital of Chin State (Hakha District)
 Kanpetlet
 Lailenpi, subtownship in west south
 Matupi, southern capital town.(Matupi District)
 Mindat, southern Chin State 
 Paletwa, southern Chin State
 Rezua,  Rezua Subtownship 
 Rihkhawdar, subtownship in the north
 Sami, subtownship in south
 Tedim, Tedim Township
 Thantlang, Thantlang Township
 Tonzang, Tonzang Township
 Webula, Webula town 
 Hnaring, Hnaring town
 Surkhua, Surkhua town
 Makui innu, Makui Innu town
 Khaikam, Khaikam subtownship in east
 Loklung village

Government

Executive

Legislature

Judiciary

Geography

Many natural watercourses flow among mountain ranges running from north to south forming valleys and gorges. The state has many rivers and the Manipur River flows through its northern half. The Tio River forms much of the border with India for the northern half of the state. The Bawinu/Beino/Chhimtuipui River, as the Kaladan River is known upstream from its confluence with the Tiau, forms the border with India for the central portion of the state. In the southwestern part of the state, the Kaladan River enters from India and flows down past Sinletwa/Salyutlana and Paletwa and exits into Rakhine State. The longest waterfall in Chin state is the Bungtla Waterfall near Matupi.

Population

Demographics

The people of Chin state are made up of many tribes which, though historically related, now speak divergent languages and have different cultural and historical identities. Some consider the name Chin an exonym, given by the Burmese and of unclear origin. There are different languages or ethnic groups in Chin State: Kcho, Laimi, Matu, Zomi, Mizo, Asho, Mara, Khumi, and Daai.

Religion
According to the 2014 Myanmar Census, Christians, who make up 85.4% of Chin State’s population, form the largest religious community there. Minority religious communities include Buddhists (13%), Muslims (0.1%), Hindus (0%), and animists (0.4%), including adherents of Pau Cin Hau, who collectively comprise the remainder of Chin State’s population. 1.1% of the population listed no religion, other religions, or were otherwise not enumerated. Chin State is the only state in Myanmar with a majority Christian population.

According to the State Sangha Maha Nayaka Committee’s 2016 statistics, 457 Buddhist monks were registered in Chin State, comprising 0.1% of Myanmar's total Sangha membership, which includes both novice samanera and fully-ordained bhikkhu. All monks in Chin State belong to the Thudhamma Nikaya (100%). 43 thilashin were registered in Chin State, comprising 0.1% of Myanmar’s total thilashin community.

Transport
The government has been building many new miles of roads in the mountainous region. Earth roads have been upgraded into metaled ones and metaled roads to bituminous facilities. The  Kalay-Falam-Haka road is already completed. Bituminous roads include
70 miles and four furlong Gangaw-Haka Road
102 miles Pakokku-Mindat-Matupi-Rezua Road
172 miles and seven furlong Haka-Rezua-Matupi Road
115 miles and one furlong Kalay-Falam-Haka Road
53 miles long Haka-Hmandaw Road is under construction and almost completed by the donation of Chin (Laimi peoples) communities around the world.
Kyaukhtu-Mindat road linking Chin State and Magway Division have been built.

ASEAN Highway crosses through the center of Chinland settling areas of Madalay-Kalay-Tamu-Lamka/Behiang.

The sector-wise upgrading of the gateways to Chin State
Mandalay-Sagaing-Monywa-Gangaw-Haka road
and
Pakokku-Pauk-Tabyin-Kyaukhtu-Mindat road
is in progress.

Kyaukhtu Airport, built by Directorate of Military Engineers of the Ministry of Defence in Kyaukhtu, Saw Township, Gangaw District, Magway Division, was commissioned into service on 10 July 2004. The airport has helped develop the transport sector of southern Chin State linking Yaw and Pakokku regions in Magway Division.

Cars can reach Kanpetlet from Magway (capital of Magway division) via Saw and from Kyautthu and Mindat and Matupi in southern Chin State from Pakukku via Kyaukhtu.

In 1988, the state has two over  bridges:
270 foot Nakzaang Bridge in Tonzang Township
240 foot Lemro Bridge in Matupi Township.

The military government has built the  Var Bridge across Manipura River on Kalay-Haka Road in Falam Township in 1998 and  'Mansuang Hlei' Bridge across River Manipura on Tedim-Kaptel-Rih Lake road in Tedim District in 2002. The  Mansaung Bridge is being built across Manipura River on Tedim-Rih Lake section.

Airports
Surbung Airport 
Paletwa Airport VYPE

Communication

Development in the communication sector
Comparison between period preceding 1988 and after (up to 31 December 2006)

Electricity
The effective use of land and water resources in the state has helped develop its power generation capacity.

In 1988, the state has four small scale hydro-power stations:
the Zalui in Tedim Township
the Tongva in Haka Towhship
the Ngasitvar in Falam Township
the Paletwa in Paletwa Township.
The military government built another 12 diesel power stations and six new hydro power plants, helping increase the power consumption.

The four new hydroelectric power plants are the
0.2 megawatt Namhlaung Creek plant in Matupi Township
0.6 megawatt Laiva plant in Falam Township
0.2 megawatt Tuisawmlui plant in Tonzang Township
0.2 megawatt Chichaung plant in Mindat Township

The Manipura Multipurpose Dam Project will be implemented.

Development in the electric power sector
Comparison between period preceding 1988 and after (up to 31 December 2006)

List of Hydro power plants
Zalui 0.40 megawatt
Tongva 0.40 megawatt
Ngasipva 1.00 megawatt
Paletwa 0.05 megawatt
Nanlaungchaung 0.20megawatt
Laiva 0.60 megawatt
Tuisawmlui 0.20 megawatt
Chichaung 0.20 megawatt
Thinthe 0.05 megawatt
Linebon 0.05 megawatt

Industrial sector
Due to the facilitation of the transport and communication sectors and increase in the power generation in the state, many new private industries have emerged in the region. The state now has 522 private industries, 179 more than 343 in 1988. The number of state-owned industries has now reached nine from five in the past. The government has been striving to develop the industrial sector of the state which will become a major tea-growing region.

Comparison between period preceding 1988 and after (up to 31 December 2006)

Education

According to official statistics, Chin State had 25 high schools in 2003.

Chin State does not have any secular colleges or universities. Students have to leave to in order to pursue higher education. Students from northern Chin State attend university in Tahan-Kalay, Sagaing Division. Students from southern Chin State attend university in Pakokku. However, there are private theological colleges in Chin State:
Chin Christian College, Hakha
Union Theological College (UTC), Matupi
Kalay University, Kalay, formerly Khaikam College
Chin Institute of Christian Theology, Falam, formerly known as Zomi Theological College 
Government Technology of Institute (GTI, Hakha)
Bethel Bible College (BBC, Tedim)
Tedim Theological College (TTC, Tedim)
Faith Baptist Bible College and Seminary (FBBC&S, Tedim)
Kalay University, formerly known as Khaikam University
Technological University (Kalay)
Computer University (Kalay)
Pakokku University
Computer University, Pakokku
Technological University, Pakokku

Health care
The general state of health care in Myanmar is poor. The health care infrastructure outside of Yangon and Mandalay is extremely poor. Although health care is nominally free, in reality, patients have to pay for medicine and treatment, even in public clinics and hospitals. Public hospitals lack many of the basic facilities and equipment. The following is a summary of the public health system in the state.

References

External links
WorldStatesman - Myanmar - States of Burma 1948-1974
For more cultural information about the Chin see F.K. Lehman. 1963. The Structure of Chin Society;: A Tribal People of Burma Adapted to a Non-Western Civilization. University of Illinois Press.
Stavanger Chin Organization
The Chin National Front
Chin Human Rights Organization
Matupi Students Union
Chin Community in Japan
Chin Community in Norway
Chin Community in Denmark
Chinland Development and Research Society in Sweden
Chin Community in Germany
Chin Christian Fellowship in Denmark
English- Chin Online Dictionary
MITCS
ZOGAM Home
Vaphual news & articles on Zo people
Chin Community Germany
The official website of Zomi Reunification Organisation
Institutes of Higher Education in Myanmar (January 2002) - arranged by state and division

 
States of Myanmar
1974 establishments in Burma
States and territories established in 1974